Frenetic is a domain-specific language for programming software-defined networks (SDNs). This domain-specific programming language allows network operators, rather than manually configuring each connected network device, to program the network as a whole. Frenetic is designed to solve major OpenFlow/NOX programming problems. In particular, Frenetic introduces a set of purely functional abstractions that enable modular program development, defines high-level, programmer-centric packet-processing operators, and eliminates many of the difficulties of the two-tier programming model by introducing a see-every-packet programming paradigm. Hence Frenetic is a functional reactive programming language operating at a packet level of abstraction.

References

Further reading

Nate Foster, Rob Harrison, Michael J. Freedman, Jennifer Rexford, and David Walker (December 6, 2010). Frenetic: A High-Level Language for OpenFlow Networks, Technical report. Cornell University. Retrieved February 22, 2011.

External links 
 

Functional programming
Computer networking
Functional languages